Arenales may refer to:

 Arenales, Aguadilla, Puerto Rico
 Arenales River (Spanish: Río Arenales), a river of Argentina
 Cerro Arenales, a volcano in Chile
 Juan Antonio Álvarez de Arenales also known as General Arenales (1770-1831), Argentinian general of Spanish origin

See also 

 General Arenales, a town in Argentina, administrative centre of the General Arenales Partido
 General Arenales Partido, a partido on the northern border of Buenos Aires Province in Argentina
 Arenales de San Gregorio, a municipality in the province of Ciudad Real, Castile-La Mancha, Spain